The Nokia 2 is a Nokia-branded budget Android smartphone by HMD Global. It was announced on 31 October 2017.

Specifications

Hardware
The Nokia 2 has a 5.0-inch LTPS IPS LCD display, a quad-core 1.3 GHz Cortex-A7 Qualcomm Snapdragon 212 processor, 1 GB of RAM and 8 GB of internal storage that can be expanded using microSD cards up to 128 GB. The phone features a 4100 mAh battery, and is claimed to have two-day battery life. The device has an 8 MP rear camera with LED flash, and a 5 MP front-facing camera. It is available in pewter and black, pewter and white, and copper and black colours.

Software
The Nokia 2 launched with Android 7.1.1 Nougat, and can be upgraded to Android 8.1 Oreo. In June 2019, HMD stated they would not be updating the phone to Android 9 Pie, because the System-on-Chip which it runs on, is not powerful enough to offer satisfactory performance with Android Pie.

Reception 
The Nokia 2 received mixed reviews. Andrew Williams of TechRadar praised the phone’s battery life and pricing, while criticising the slow performance, poor cameras, and limited storage.

References 

2
Mobile phones introduced in 2017
Discontinued smartphones